
Gmina Zwoleń is an urban-rural gmina (administrative district) in Zwoleń County, Masovian Voivodeship, in east-central Poland.

Villages
Apart from the town of Zwoleń, Gmina Zwoleń contains the villages and settlements of Atalin, Barycz Nowa, Barycz Stara, Barycz-Kolonia, Bożenczyzna, Celestynów, Cyganówka, Drozdów, Filipinów, Helenów, Helenówka, Jasieniec Solecki, Jasieniec-Kolonia, Jedlanka, Józefów, Karczówka, Karolin, Kopaniny, Koszary, Linów, Linów-Leśniczówka, Ługi, Męciszów, Melanów, Michalin, Mieczysławów, Miodne-Gajówka, Miodne-Leśniczówka, Mostki, Motorzyny-Leśniczówka, Niwki, Osiny, Ostrowy, Paciorkowa Wola Nowa, Paciorkowa Wola Stara, Pałki, Podlinówek, Podzagajnik, Sosnowice, Strykowice Błotne, Strykowice Górne, Strykowice Podleśne, Sycyna Północna, Sycyna Południowa, Sycyna-Kolonia, Sydół, Szczęście, Wacławów, Wacławów-Gajówka, Wólka Szelężna, Zastocze, Zielonka Nowa and Zielonka Stara.

Neighbouring gminas
Gmina Zwoleń is bordered by the gminas of Chotcza, Ciepielów, Gózd, Kazanów, Pionki, Policzna, Przyłęk and Tczów.

References
Polish official population figures 2006

Zwolen
Zwoleń County